= Sledge (film) =

- Directed by: John B Sovie II; Kristian Hanson
- Written by: Kristian Hanson
- Produced by: John B Sovie II; Kristian Hanson
- Starring: Kristian Hanson; Dustin Bowman; Tino Faygo
- Cinematography: John B Sovie II
- Edited by: John B Sovie II
- Music by: Eric Xton
- Production company: CH Productions
- Distributed by: Maxim Media International
- Release date: 2 September 2014
- Running time: 75 minutes
- Country: United States
- Language: English

Sledge is a 2014 American horror film directed by John B Sovie II and Kristian Hanson, starring Kristian Hanson, Dustin Bowman and Tino Faygo.

== Cast ==
- Kristian Hanson as Adam Lynch
- Dustin Bowman as Alex
- Tino Faygo as Dickie
- Stephanie Tupper as Sarah
- Travis Hanson as Shawn
- Desiree Holmes as Michelle
- Rachel Cornell as Couch Girl
- Wendy Miller as Blanket Couple
- Troy Miller as Blanket Couple

== Reception ==
HorrorNews.net wrote that "While it never delivers huge scares, ‘Sledge’ tickles and entertains in nearly all the right places." Mark L. Miller of Ain't It Cool News called it "an ambitious and well intentioned experiment that just isn’t so successful at mixing subgenres and telling an engaging tale."

Richard Axtell of Nerdly wrote that "while it tried to be both funny and horrific, it never managed to really achieve either." Debi Moore of Dread Central gave the film a rating of 1.5 out of 5, writing that "it’s just too painful to sit through."
